The Karnataka Milk Federation (KMF) is a dairy cooperative from Karnataka, India, which sells products such as milk, curds, ghee, butter, ice cream, chocolates, and sweets under the brand name Nandini.
It is a federation of milk producers under the ownership of  Ministry of Cooperation, Government of Karnataka. Almost every district in Karnataka has milk producing co-operatives. The milk is collected from farmers who are its members, processed and sold in the market under the Nandini brand. It is the second-largest milk co-operative in India after Amul.

Background

The first of the dairy co-operatives that make up KMF started in 1955 in Kudige, Kodagu District. KMF was founded in 1974 as Karnataka Dairy Development Corporation (KDDC) to implement a dairy development project run by the World Bank. In 1984 the organisation was renamed KMF. KMF has 14 milk unions throughout the Karnataka State which procure milk from Primary Dairy Cooperative Societies (DCS) and distribute milk to the consumers in various urban and rural markets in Karnataka State with 1,500 members.

Operations

Occasionally, there is spillover from Karnataka politics into the activities of KMF, including the elections for the post of chairman, and the timing of the milk price hike.

Rajkumar has worked as the ambassador, free of cost and had done his first and last television commercial in 1996. Later Puneeth Rajkumar was selected as the ambassador for Nandini Products. In Dec 2009, Puneeth Rajkumar signed an agreement with KMF, free of cost. In 2014 Shriya Saran was selected as Nandini Good Life Product Ambassador in Tamil Nadu, Kerala, Telangana, Andhra Pradesh. Some of the products made by KMF under the brand name Nandini are available in Maharashtra, Goa, Telangana, Andhra Pradesh and Tamilnadu.

See also
Bihar State Milk Co-operative Federation
Kerala Co-operative Milk Marketing Federation
Odisha State Cooperative Milk Producers' Federation
Haryana Dairy Development Cooperative Federation Ltd

References

External links 

Economy of Karnataka
Dairy products companies of India
Dairy cooperatives in India
Ice cream brands
 Dairy farming in India